Villorba is a comune (municipality) in the Province of Treviso in the Italian region Veneto, located about  north of Venice and about  north of Treviso.

Villorba borders the following municipalities: Arcade, Carbonera, Ponzano Veneto, Povegliano, Spresiano, Treviso.

Twin towns
Villorba is twinned with:

  Arborea, Italy

References

External links 
 

Cities and towns in Veneto